Talin-1 is a protein that in humans is encoded by the TLN1 gene. Talin-1 is ubiquitously expressed, and is localized to costamere structures in cardiac and skeletal muscle cells, and to focal adhesions in smooth muscle and non-muscle cells. Talin-1 functions to mediate cell-cell adhesion via the linkage of integrins to the actin cytoskeleton and in the activation of integrins. Altered expression of talin-1 has been observed in patients with heart failure, however no mutations in TLN1 have been linked with specific diseases.

Structure 

Human talin-1 is 270.0 kDa molecular weight and 2541 amino acids. The N-terminal region of talin-1 is ~50 kDa in size and homologous to members of the ERM protein family which have a globular FERM domain (residues 86-400) that links the actin cytoskeleton to adhesion proteins. In addition to F-actin, the N-terminal region of talin-1 binds layilin, β1- and β3-integrin, and focal adhesion kinase. Talin-1 N-terminal region also binds acidic phospholipids for insertion into lipid bilayers. The rod domain (>200 kDa) has considerable flexibility and houses a conserved actin binding site, three vinculin binding sites, and also has an additional integrin binding site, termed IBS2. The head and rod domains are connected by an unstructured linker region (residues 401-481), which houses several sites of phosphorylation, as well as protease cleavage.  Talin-1 can homodimerize in an antiparallel fashion, however, talin-1 and its closely related counterpart, talin-2 do not form heterodimers.

Function 

In mammals talin-1 is ubiquitously expressed; talin-1 is found complexed to integrins and localized to intercalated discs of cardiac muscle and to costamere structures of both skeletal and cardiac muscles, in correspondence with the I-band and M-line. Talin-1 is also found at focal adhesions of smooth muscle cells  and non-muscle cells.

In undifferentiated cultures of myoblasts, talin-1 expression is perinuclear, and then progresses to a cytoplasmic distribution followed by a sarcomlemmal, costameric-like pattern by day 15 of differentiation. Homozygous disruption of TLN1 in mice is embryonic lethal, demonstrating that talin-1 is required for normal embryogenesis. It has been shown, however, that talin-1 expression is minor in adult cardiomyocytes, and becomes more prominent at costameres during cardiac hypertrophy induced by pharmacological and mechanical stress.

The primary function of talin-1 involves the linkage of integrins to the actin cytoskeleton and in the energy-dependent activation of integrins. Functions for talin-1 in specific tissues have been illuminated through conditional knockout animals. Studies employing the conditional knockout of talin 1 in skeletal muscle have demonstrated its role in maintaining integrin attachment sites at myotendinous junctions; knockout mice develop progressive myopathy and show deficits in muscle force generation. In platelets, conditional knockout of talin-1 results in the inability to activate integrins in response to platelet agonists, resulting in mice with severe hemostatic defects and resistance to arterial thrombosis. Conditional knockout of talin-1 in cardiomyocytes shows that mice have normal cardiac function at baseline, but improved function, blunted hypertrophy, and attenuated fibrosis when subjected to pressure overload-induced cardiac hypertrophy, which correlated with blunted ERK1/2, p38, Akt, and glycogen synthase kinase 3 responses. These data suggest that upregulation of talin-1 in cardiac hypertrophy may be detrimental to cardiomyocytes function.

Clinical significance 

In patients with heart failure, talin-1 expression in cardiomyocytes is increased relative to control cells.

Interactions 

TLN1 has been shown to interact with:

 ACTA1,
 CD61,
 ITGB1,
 LAYN,
 PXN, 
 PIP5K1C,
 PTK2, 
 SYNM, and
 VCL.

See also 
 Talin protein

References

Further reading

External links